Van Geneugden is a surname. Notable people with the surname include:

Martin Van Geneugden (1932–2014), Belgian cyclist
Ronny Van Geneugden (born 1968), Belgian footballer and manager

Surnames of Dutch origin